Changha is a khum (commune) of Ou Chrov District in Banteay Meanchey Province in north-western Cambodia.

Villages

 Boeng Seila(បឹង សីលា)
 Ta Chrueng(តាច្រឹង)
 Ta Phaok(តាភក)
 Paoy Voat(ប៉ូយវត្ដ)
 Chhuk
 Chrey(ជ្រៃ)

References

Communes of Banteay Meanchey province
Ou Chrov District